Vrangel was an urban locality (an urban-type settlement) in Primorsky Krai, Russia, located on east coast of Nakhodka Bay. Its foundation date is unknown. On December 1, 2004 it was merged with the city of Nakhodka.  Population: 

Vostochny Port, one of Russia's largest ports, is located near Vrangel.

References

Notes

Sources
Приморский крайисполком. "Приморский край.  Административно-территориальное деление на 1 января 1968 г." Дальневосточное книжное издательство. Владивосток, 1968.

Nakhodka
Transport in the Russian Far East
Geography of Primorsky Krai